496 (four hundred [and] ninety-six) is the natural number following 495 and preceding 497.

In mathematics
496 is most notable for being a perfect number, and one of the earliest numbers to be recognized as such. As a perfect number, it is tied to the Mersenne prime 31, 25 − 1, with 24 (25 − 1) yielding 496. Also related to its being a perfect number, 496 is a harmonic divisor number, since the number of proper divisors of 496 divided by the sum of the reciprocals of its divisors, 1, 2, 4, 8, 16, 31, 62, 124, 248 and 496, (the harmonic mean), yields an integer, 5 in this case.

A triangular number and a hexagonal number, 496 is also a centered nonagonal number. Being the 31st triangular number, 496 is the smallest counterexample to the hypothesis that one more than an even triangular prime-indexed number is a prime number. It is the largest happy number less than 500.

There is no solution to the equation φ(x) = 496, making 496 a nontotient.

E8 has real dimension 496.

In physics
The number 496 is a very important number in superstring theory. In 1984, Michael Green and John H. Schwarz realized that one of the necessary conditions for a superstring theory to make sense is that the dimension of the gauge group of type I string theory must be 496. The group is therefore SO(32). Their discovery started the first superstring revolution. It was realized in 1985 that the heterotic string can admit another possible gauge group, namely E8 x E8.

Telephone numbers
The UK's Ofcom reserves telephone numbers in many dialing areas in the 496 local block for fictional purposes, such as 0114 496-1234.

See also 
 AD 496

References 

Integers